Dalton Eiley (born October 12, 1983) is a Belizean professional defender currently playing for Placencia Assassins and the Belize national team.

External links
 

1983 births
Living people
Belizean footballers
Belize international footballers
Premier League of Belize players
2005 UNCAF Nations Cup players
2007 UNCAF Nations Cup players
2011 Copa Centroamericana players
2013 Copa Centroamericana players
2013 CONCACAF Gold Cup players
2014 Copa Centroamericana players
Association football defenders
Altitude FC (Belize) players
Belmopan Bandits players
Freedom Fighters FC players